Liberty Township is an inactive township in Iron County, in the U.S. state of Missouri.

Liberty Township was established in 1857, and named for the American concept of liberty.

References

Townships in Missouri
Townships in Iron County, Missouri
1857 establishments in Missouri